Tomasa  is a Spanish female name. It may refer to:

Art & media
Tomasa Diego, lead character in Noh Matta Wat!
Tomasa Tequiero, Venezuelan soap opera
"La negra Tomasa", also known as "Bilongo", famous guaracha by Guillermo Rodríguez Fiffe

People
Roxana Tomasa Díaz Sánchez (b. 1981), Cuban athlete
Tomasa Manalo, wife of Christian sect leader Felix Manalo
María Tomasa Palafox, Marquise of Villafranca (b. 1780), Spanish aristocrat
Tomasa Vives (b. 1959), Mexican politician

See also
Tomás (given name), masculine form of Tomasa
Thomas (name)

Spanish feminine given names